"Summertime" is a 2008 single from British grime artist Wiley. It was released on 13 October 2008 and samples Daft Punk's song, "Aerodynamic".

Music video
The video starts with Wiley on many different video screens, and features Wiley and female dancers against many different backgrounds. The video later involves Wiley performing the song at a gig with dancers, a segment involving him going into the crowd. Unlike the other two videos from the See Clear Now album, the "Summertime" video features Wiley on screen.

Chart performance

2008 singles
Wiley (musician) songs
Song recordings produced by Jake Gosling
Songs written by Wiley (musician)
2008 songs
Asylum Records singles